"Hey Now" is a song by British trip hop trio London Grammar from their debut studio album If You Wait (2013). The song was released in the United Kingdom on 16 March 2014 as a digital download. The song has peaked at number 37 on the UK Singles Chart, and has also charted in France. The song was written by Hannah Reid, Dot Major, Daniel Rothman and produced by Tim Bran, Roy Kerr and London Grammar.

Music video
A music video to accompany the release of "Hey Now" was first released onto YouTube on 19 February 2014 at a total length of three minutes and thirty-three seconds. As of May 2020, the video has received more than 27 million views.

Track listing

Usage in Media 
The Arty remix of the song appears in the soundtrack of the 2014 racing video game Forza Horizon 2 (played on the in-game radio station "Horizon Bass Arena"), and the 2020 BBC and Hulu miniseries Normal People. In September 2015 another remix version "Hey Now (J'adore Dior Remix by The Shoes)" was used in a Dior fragrance commercial starring Charlize Theron. Arty's remix also appears in episode 3 of the 2020 TV series Normal People.

Charts

Certifications

Release history

References

2014 singles
2014 songs
London Grammar songs
Pop ballads
Songs written by Hannah Reid
Songs written by Dan Rothman
Songs written by Dominic Major